Tom Mueller (born January 5, 1946) is a former American football coach.  He served as the head football coach at the Texas Lutheran University from 2002 to 2006, compiling a record of 22–28.  Mueller was born on January 5, 1946, in Cleveland, Ohio.  He earned a Bachelor of Science degree from Concordia University Nebraska in 1968 and a Master of Science degree from Eastern Michigan University.

Head coaching record

References

1946 births
Living people
North Dakota State Bison football players
TCU Horned Frogs football coaches
Texas Lutheran Bulldogs football coaches
Texas State Bobcats football coaches
High school football coaches in Michigan
Concordia University Nebraska alumni
Eastern Michigan University alumni
Sportspeople from Cleveland
Players of American football from Cleveland